Billingsgate is one of the 25 Wards of the City of London. This small City Ward is situated on the north bank of the River Thames between London Bridge and Tower Bridge in the south-east of the Square Mile.

The modern Ward extends south to the Thames, west to Lovat Lane and Rood Lane, north to Fenchurch Street and Dunster Court, and east to Mark Lane and St Dunstan's Hill.

History

Legendary origin
Billingsgate's most ancient historical reference is as a water gate to the city of Trinovantum (the name given to London in medieval British legend), as mentioned in the Historia Regum Britanniae (Eng: History of the Kings of Britain) written  1136 by Geoffrey of Monmouth. This work describes how Belinus, a legendary king of Britain said to have held the throne from about 390 BC, erected London's first fortified water gate:

Historical origin
Originally known as Blynesgate and Byllynsgate, its name apparently derives from its origins as a water gate on the Thames, where goods were landed, becoming Billingsgate Wharf, part of London's docks close to Lower Thames Street.

Historian John Stow records that Billingsgate Market was a general market for corn, coal, iron, wine, salt, pottery, fish and miscellaneous goods until the 16th century, when neighbouring streets became a specialist fish market. By the late 16th century, most merchant vessels had become too large to pass under London Bridge, and so Billingsgate, with its deeply recessed harbour, replaced Queenhithe as the most important landing place in the city.

Great Fire of London
Until boundary changes in 2003, the Ward included Pudding Lane, where in 1666 the Great Fire of London started. A sign was erected over the property where the Great Fire began:

After the Great Fire
After the Great Fire of London, shops and stalls set up trade forming arcades on the harbour's west side, whilst on the main quay, an open market soon developed, called "Roomland".

Fish market

Billingsgate Fish Market was formally established by an Act of Parliament in 1699 to be "a free and open market for all sorts of fish whatsoever". Oranges, lemons, and Spanish onions were also landed there, alongside the other main commodities, coal and salt. In 1849, the fish market was moved off the streets into its own riverside building, which was subsequently demolished (c. 1873) and replaced by an arcaded-market hall (designed by City architect Horace Jones, built by John Mowlem) in 1875.

In 1982, Billingsgate Fish Market was relocated to its present location close to Canary Wharf in east London. The original riverside market building was then refurbished by the architect Richard Rogers to provide office accommodation and an entertainment venue.

The raucous cries of the fish vendors gave rise to the word Billingsgate as a synonym for profanity or offensive language.

Within the Ward are the Customs House and the Watermen's Hall, built in 1780 and the city's only surviving Georgian Livery company hall. Centennium House in Lower Thames Street has Roman baths within its basement foundations.

Churches
Within the Ward remain two churches: St Mary-at-Hill and St Margaret Pattens, after the demolition of St George Botolph Lane in 1904.

Politics
Billingsgate is one of the City's 25 Wards returning an Alderman and two Common Councilmen (the City equivalent of a Councillor) to the City of London Corporation, the elected in March 2022 were Luis Felipe Tilleria and Nighat Qureishi.

In popular culture

Lord Blackadder, the titular hero of Blackadder II, is said to have resided at Billingsgate, and in Thackeray's Vanity Fair (Ch. 3), Mr. Sedley has "brought home the best turbot in Billingsgate".

Billingsgate is also referred to in the song "Sister Suffragette" in the 1964 version of Mary Poppins.

Due to the real and perceived vulgar language used by the fishmongers, which Francis Grose referred to in his Dictionary of the Vulgar Tongue, Billingsgate came to be used as a noun—billingsgate—referring to coarse or foul language.

References

External links

Ward Constable profile
Ward map
Ward Club 
Map of Early Modern London:  Billingsgate Ward - Historical Map and Encyclopedia of Shakespeare's London (Scholarly)

Bibliography
The City of London: A History Borer M I C, New York, D.McKay Co, 1978 
Vanished churches of the City of London Huelin G, London, Guildhall Library Publishing 1996 
The Churches of the City of London Reynolds H London, Bodley Head, 1922
A Survey of London, Vol I Stow J p. 427 Originally, 1598: this edn-London, A.Fullarton & Co, 1890
Wren, Whinney M, London, Thames & Hudson, 1971 

Wards of the City of London